Dicephalospora is a genus of fungi in the family Sclerotiniaceae. The genus was circumscribed by mycologist Brian Spooner in 1987.

Species
D. calochroa (Syd.) Spooner (1987)
D. chrysotricha (Berk.) Verkley (2004)
D. damingshanica W.Y.Zhuang (1999)
D. pinglongshanica W.Y.Zhuang (1999)
D. rufocornea (Berk. & Broome) Spooner (1987)

References

Helotiales genera
Sclerotiniaceae
Taxa described in 1987